Henry Elliot Malden  (8 May 1849, Bloomsbury – Dorking, March 1931), known as H. E. Malden, was, for 30 years,  honorary secretary of the Royal Historical Society, of which he was a Fellow.

The son of Henry Malden, a professor of Greek, he was educated at Queen Elizabeth's School, Ipswich and Trinity Hall, Cambridge, where he obtained, in 1872, a second-class degree in the Classical Tripos. He won the Chancellor's Medal for English verse in 1871.  Malden became a local historian, editing the Victoria County History of Surrey.

He married, in 1879, Margaret Eleanor Whatman of Kitlands, Surrey and had five sons and three daughters.

Notes

References

External links
 

1849 births
1931 deaths
Alumni of Trinity Hall, Cambridge
Contributors to the Victoria County History
19th-century English historians
Fellows of the Royal Historical Society
History of Surrey
English local historians
People educated at Ipswich School
People from Bloomsbury
20th-century English historians